The Ogishima Solar Power Plant (扇島太陽光発電所) is a 13 MW solar photovoltaic power station located on the waterfront in Kawasaki. It is the second, and the largest solar plant built by Tepco, and was completed on December 19, 2011. In the first year of operation, it produced 15,059 MWh, a capacity factor of 0.13, which was about 10% greater than anticipated. An unusual feature of the plant is that the panels are mounted at a fixed angle of 10°, instead of the 30°, which would normally be considered optimal for this latitude.

See also

Komekurayama Solar Power Plant
Ukishima Solar Power Plant
Solar power in Japan

References 

Photovoltaic power stations in Japan
Buildings and structures in Kawasaki, Kanagawa
Tokyo Electric Power Company
Energy infrastructure completed in 2011
2011 establishments in Japan